A Question of Silence is a 1982 Dutch drama film written and directed by Marleen Gorris. It is Gorris' debut film. It stars  as Christine M. The plot is about three women, strangers to each other, who kill a man they do not know. It was highly controversial but also highly acclaimed at the time of its release, and is now hailed as a feminist classic.

Plot
Christine is a housewife, who does not speak. Her husband works while she stays home with their three children. Andrea is an executive secretary in an office predominantly run by men. Annie is a jolly waitress at a local café. These three women have never met before until one day in a dress boutique Christine attempts to shoplift a dress by slipping it into her bag. She is approached by the male owner of the store. After refusing to return the garment, Andrea and Annie join Christine in a circle around the man. Together, the three women brutally murder him as a group of women stand and silently but attentively watch.

Female criminal psychiatrist, Janine, is appointed to the case of these three women by the court to determine if they are sane or crazy.  Janine takes the time to get to know each woman and their story. None of the three will say why they committed the crime, Janine comes to realize they were fed up with the strain of living in a patriarchy. After much deliberation, she concludes that they are all sane and finds herself identifying with them. Eventually tensions rise between Janine and her husband because he worries her statement in court will ruin his reputation.

The court date arrives and Janine gives her professional opinion that the three women are in fact sane and that the court should take into consideration that the owner of the boutique was a male. Despite the prosecutor's attempts to get her to change her opinion, she stands her ground. When the prosecutor suggests that the crime would have still happened if the owner were a woman, Christine, Andrea, Annie, Janine and the other women who witnessed the crime all laugh and exit the courtroom.

Cast
 as Christine M.
 as Annie
Henriëtte Tol as Andrea
Cox Habbema as Janine van den Bos
 as Ruud van den Bos
 as Judge
Erik Plooyer as Officer of Justice

Distribution
A Question of Silence was shown at the 1982 Toronto International Film Festival. That year it won the Grand Prix at the Créteil International Women's Film Festival and the Golden Calf at the Nederlands Film Festival. The film had its 30th anniversary screening at the 2012 London Feminist Film Festival.

References

External links

1982 drama films
1980s feminist films
Dutch drama films
1980s English-language films
Courtroom films
Films directed by Marleen Gorris